Amphidiscella is a genus of sea sponge in the family Euplectellidae.

Species 
The following species are accepted within Amphidiscella:

 Amphidiscella abyssalis Reiswig & Kelly, 2018
 Amphidiscella atlantica Tabachnick & Collins, 2008
 Amphidiscella caledonica Tabachnick & Lévi, 1997
 Amphidiscella hosiei Tabachnick & Fromont, 2019
 Amphidiscella lecus Reiswig, 2014
 Amphidiscella monai Tabachnick & Lévi, 1997
 Amphidiscella sonnae Reiswig & Kelly, 2018

References

Hexactinellida genera
Animals described in 1997
Hexactinellida